Mehmed V Reşâd (or ; 2 November 1844 – 3 July 1918) reigned as the 35th and penultimate Ottoman Sultan. He was the son of Sultan Abdulmejid I. He succeeded his half-brother Abdul Hamid II after the 31 March Incident. He was succeeded by his half-brother Mehmed VI.

His nine-year reign was marked by the cession of the Empire's North African territories and the Dodecanese Islands, including Rhodes, in the Italo-Turkish War, the traumatic loss of almost all of the Empire's European territories west of Constantinople (now Istanbul) in the First Balkan War, and the entry of the Ottoman Empire into World War I in 1914, which would ultimately lead to the Empire's end.

Early life
Mehmed V was born on 2 November 1844 at the Çırağan Palace, Istanbul. His father was Sultan Abdulmejid I, and his mother was Gülcemal Kadın. He had three elder sisters, Fatma Sultan, Refia Sultan and Hatice Sultan (Refia Sultan's twin sister, died as newborn). After his mother's death in 1851, he and his sisters were entrusted in the care of his father's senior consort Servetseza Kadın. She had asked Abdulmejid to take the motherless children under her wing, and raise as her own, and carried out the duties of a mother who cares for her children with compassion and concern.

In 1856, aged twelve, he was ceremoniously circumcised together with his younger half-brothers, Şehzade Ahmed Kemaleddin, Şehzade Mehmed Burhaneddin, and Şehzade Ahmed Nureddin.

Mehmed was educated at the palace. Halid Ziya, the chief clerk of the Chamberlain's office between 1909 and 1912, described this as being a poor one. Thanks to his comparatively high intelligence, however, he made good use of the education he had and used it to go further. He studied Arabic and Persian, and spoke the latter very well. He took piano lessons from an Italian pianist and calligraphy lessons from a famous Ottoman calligrapher, Kazasker Mustafa Izzet Efendi (1801–1876), who designed the giant pendant medallions of the Hagia Sophia.

Reign
His reign began at the conclusion of the 31 March Incident on 27 April 1909, but he was largely a figurehead with no real political power, as a consequence of the demonstration of the CUP's power in the 31 March Incident and the Young Turk Revolution (which restored the Ottoman Constitution and Parliament). In 1913 the CUP undertook a coup d'état, which brought the dictatorial triumvirate of the Three Pashas to power. At the age of 64, Mehmed V was the oldest person to ascend the Ottoman throne.

In 1911, he embarked on an imperial tour of Selânik (Salonica, today Thessaloniki) and Manastır (today Bitola), stopping by Florina on the way. He also visited Üsküp (Skopje) and Priştine (Pristina), where he attended Friday prayers at the Tomb of Sultan Murad. The visit was recorded on film and photographs by the Manaki brothers. It would soon prove to be the last visit of an Ottoman sultan to the Rumelian provinces before the catastrophe of the Balkan Wars the following year.

Under his rule, the Ottoman Empire lost all its remaining territory in North Africa (Tripolitania, Cyrenaica and Fezzan) and the Dodecanese to Italy in the Italo-Turkish War and nearly all its European territories (except for a small strip of land west of Constantinople) in the First Balkan War. The Ottomans made some small gains in the following war, recapturing the peninsula comprising East Thrace up to Edirne, but this was only partial consolation for the Turks: the bulk of Ottoman territories that they had fought to keep had been lost forever.

The sudden loss of these enormous swathes of land, which had been Ottoman territory for centuries and were ceded to its opponents within a span of only two years, was deeply shocking to the Ottoman Turks and resulted in massive popular backlash against the government, culminating in the 1913 Ottoman coup d'etat. It also spelt the end the Ottomanism movement, which for several decades had advocated equal rights to all citizens of the Empire regardless of ethnicity or religion, in order to foster a communal sense of belonging and allegiance to the Ottoman state. With the loss of the Empire's ethnic minorities in Rumelia and North Africa, the movement also lost much of its impetus, and the country's politics soon began to take on a more reactionary character, centred around Turkish nationalism. The more extreme elements of this right-wing faction, primarily in the upper echelons of the CUP-dominated government, would go on to commit atrocities against the Armenians.

Despite his preference that the country stayed out of further conflict, Mehmed V's most significant political act was to formally declare jihad against the Entente Powers (Allies of World War I) on 14 November 1914, following the Ottoman government's decision to join the First World War on the side of the Central Powers. He was actually said to look with disfavour on the pro-German policy of Enver Pasha, but could do little to prevent war due to the sultanate's diminished influence since the overthrow of Abdülhamid II in 1909.

This was the last genuine proclamation of jihad in history by a Caliph, as the Caliphate was abolished in 1924. As a direct result of the declaration of war, the British annexed Cyprus, while the Khedivate of Egypt proclaimed its independence and was turned into a British protectorate; these provinces had at least been under nominal Turkish rule. The proclamation had no noticeable effect on the war, despite the fact that many Muslims lived in Ottoman territories. Some Arabs eventually joined the British forces against the Ottomans with the Arab Revolt in 1916.

Mehmed V hosted Kaiser Wilhelm II, his World War I ally, in Constantinople on 15 October 1917. He was made Generalfeldmarschall of the Kingdom of Prussia on 27 January 1916, and of the German Empire on 1 February 1916. He was also made Generalfeldmarschall of Austria-Hungary on 19 May 1918.

Death
Mehmed V died at Yıldız Palace on 3 July 1918 at the age of 73, only four months before the end of World War I. Thus, he did not live to see the downfall of the Ottoman Empire. He spent most of his life at the Dolmabahçe Palace and Yıldız Palace in Istanbul. His grave is in the Eyüp district of modern Istanbul.

Honours
 Ottoman honours
 Grand Master of the Order of the Crescent
 Grand Master of the Order of Glory
 Grand Master of the Order of the Medjidie
 Grand Master of the Order of Osmanieh

 Foreign honours
 Grand Cross of St. Stephen, in Diamonds, 1914 (Austria-Hungary)
 Knight of the Military Order of Max Joseph (Bavaria)
 Grand Cross of the Star of Karađorđe (Yugoslavia)

Family
Mehmed V had a small harem, as well as few children. He was also the only sultan not to take new consorts after his accession to the throne.

Consorts
Mehmed V had five consorts:
Kamures Kadın (5 March 1855 - 30 April 1921). BaşKadin. She is also called Gamres, Kamres or Kamus. Of Caucasian descent, she married Mehmed when he was still Şehzade. She had a son.
Dürriaden Kadın (16 May 1860 - 17 October 1909). Second Kadın. She born Hatice Hanim, she married Mehmed when he was still Şehzade. She was the aunt of Inşirah Hanim, who was a consort of Mehmed VI (Mehmed V's younger half-brother). She had a son.
Mihrengiz Kadın (15 October 1869 - 12 December 1938). Second Kadın after Dürriaden's death. Circassian, born Fatma Hanım, married Mehmed when he was still Şehzade. She had a son.
Nazperver Kadın (12 June 1870 - 9 March 1929). Third Kadın after Dürriaden's death. Born Rukiye Hanim, she was an Abkhazian princess of Çikotua family and niece of Dürrinev Kadın, chief consort of Sultan Abdülaziz, who educated her. She married Mehmed when he was still Şehzade. She had a daughter.
Dilfirib Kadın (1890 - 1952). Fourth Kadın after Dürriaden's death. Circassian, she married Mehmed when he was still Şehzade. She was close friends with Safiye Ünüvar, a teacher at the Palace. She had no children by Mehmed, but after his death she remarried and had a son.

Sons
Mehmed V had three sons:
Şehzade Mehmed Ziyaeddin (26 August 1873 - 30 January 1938) - with Kamures Kadın. He had five consorts, two sons and six daughters.
Şehzade Mahmud Necmeddin (23 June 1878 - 27 June 1913) - with Dürriaden Kadın. Born with kyphosis, he never married or had children.
Şehzade Ömer Hilmi (2 March 1886 - 6 April 1935) - with Mihrengiz Kadın. He had five consorts, a son and a daughter. His great-granddaughter Ayşe Gülnev Osmanoğlu became an authress of historical novels about the Ottoman dynasty.

Daughters
Mehmed V had only one daughter:
Refia Sultan (1888 - 1888) - with Nazperver Kadın. She died as newborn.

See also
The Ottomans: Europe's Muslim Emperors

References

Sources

External links 

 

20th-century Ottoman sultans
1844 births
1918 deaths
Turks from the Ottoman Empire
Ottoman people of the Italo-Turkish War
Ottoman people of the Balkan Wars
Ottoman people of World War I
Dolmabahçe Palace
Knights of the Military Order of Max Joseph
Knights of the Order of the Crescent
Grand Crosses of the Order of Saint Stephen of Hungary
Burials at Eyüp Cemetery